{{Infobox education in country
|country name = Scotland
|agency image = File:Scottish Government Logo.svg
|agency = Scottish Government & Education Scotland
|leader titles = Cabinet Secretary  Cabinet Secretary for Education and Skills  Junior Ministers  Minister for Children and Young People  Minister for Further Education, Higher Education and Science 
|leader names =  Shirley-Anne Somerville MSP   Maree Todd MSP  Richard Lochhead MSP
|budget = £2.6 bn
|funding per student= £3,855 (2004–2005)‡
|primary languages = English, Scottish Gaelic
|system type = National
|established events = Compulsory education
|established dates = 1872
|literacy year = 
|literacy total = 
|literacy men = 
|literacy women = 
|enroll total = 1,452,240
|enroll primary =  390,260
|enroll secondary = 322,980
|enroll post-secondary = 739,000#
|enrollment year = 2005
|attain secondary =  
|attain post-secondary = 
|attainment year = 
|footnotes = ‡: Expenditure on Pre-school, Primary and Secondary education only.#: 2004, All further and higher education institutions includes overseas students.
}}
Education in Scotland is overseen by the Scottish Government and its executive agency Education Scotland. Education in Scotland has a history of universal provision of public education, and the Scottish education system is distinctly different from those in the other countries of the United Kingdom. The Scotland Act 1998 gives the Scottish Parliament legislative control over all education matters, and the Education (Scotland) Act 1980 is the principal legislation governing education in Scotland. Traditionally, the Scottish system at secondary school level has emphasised breadth across a range of subjects, while the English, Welsh and Northern Irish systems have emphasised greater depth of education over a smaller range of subjects.

Following this, Scottish universities generally have courses a year longer (typically 4 years) than their counterparts elsewhere in the UK, though it is often possible for students to take more advanced specialised exams and join the courses at the second year. One unique aspect is that the ancient universities of Scotland issue a Master of Arts as the first degree in humanities. State schools are owned and operated by the local authorities which act as Education Authorities, and the compulsory phase is divided into primary school and secondary school (often called high school). Schools are supported in delivering learning and teaching by Education Scotland (formerly Learning and Teaching Scotland). There are also private schools across the country, although the distribution is uneven with such schools in 22 of the 32 Local Authority areas. At September 2011 the total pupil population in Scotland was 702,104, of which 31,425 pupils, or 4.5%, were being educated in independent schools.

Qualifications at the secondary school and post-secondary (further education) level are provided by the Scottish Qualifications Authority, which is the national awarding and accrediting body in Scotland, and delivered through various schools, colleges and other centres. Political responsibility for education at all levels is vested in the Scottish Parliament and the Learning Directorate. Inspections and audits of educational standards are conducted by three bodies: Care Inspectorate inspects care standards in pre-school provision; Education Scotland (formerly Her Majesty's Inspectorate of Education) for pre-school, primary, education, further and community education; with the Scottish office of the Quality Assurance Agency for Higher Education (QAA Scotland) responsible for higher education.

In 2014, research by the Office for National Statistics found that Scotland was the most highly educated country in Europe and among the most well-educated in the world in terms of tertiary education attainment, above countries like Finland, Ireland and Luxembourg, with roughly 40% of Scots aged 16–64 educated to NVQ level 4 and above.

History

Stages of compulsory education

Children start primary school aged between 4½ and 5½ depending on when the child's birthday falls. Scottish school policy places all those born between March of a given year and February of the following year in the same year group. Children born between March and August start school in August at between 5 and 5½ years old, and those born between September and February start school in the previous August at between age 4½ and 4 years 11 months years old. The Scottish system is the most flexible in the UK, however, as parents of children born between September and December can decide to defer for 1 year (but may or may not receive a funded nursery place in the deferral year), whilst children born between January and February can opt to hold their child back a year and let them start school the following August, with guaranteed nursery funding. This usually allows those not ready for formal education to have an extra year at an early years centre (formerly known as nursery).

Pupils remain at primary school for seven years. Then aged eleven or twelve, they start secondary school for a compulsory four years with the following two years being optional. In Scotland, pupils sit National 4/5 exams (previously Standard Grade or Intermediate exams) at the age of fifteen/sixteen, normally for between 6 and eight subjects including compulsory exams in English and Mathematics. A Science subject (Physics, Biology or Chemistry) and a Social Subject (Geography, History or Modern Studies) were also compulsory, but this was changed in accordance with the new curriculum. It is now required by the Scottish Parliament for students to have two hours of physical education a week; each school may vary these compulsory combinations. The school leaving age is generally sixteen (after completion of National 4/5s), after which students may choose to remain at school and study for Higher and/or Advanced Higher exams.

A small number of students at certain private, private schools may follow the English system and study towards GCSE instead of National 4/5s (Standard Grades), and towards A and AS-Levels instead of (or alongside) Higher Grade and Advanced Higher exams. The International Baccalaureate has also been introduced in some independent schools.

The table below lists rough equivalences with the year system in the rest of the United Kingdom (For England and Wales, the equivalence given is for children born before 1 September; the equivalence for those born from September to February [December for deferred pupils] is given in brackets):

Access to provision

Government funded schools are free for children aged 5–19. In many cases, this applies to children of international post-graduate students, and other immigrants.

The age ranges specify the youngest age for a child entering that year and the oldest age for a child leaving that year. Playgroup can be described as a daycare centre for toddlers, then children may go on to attend an early years centre as soon as they have passed their third birthday, and progress to Primary 1 in the August of the year in which they turn five.

In general, the cut-off point for ages is the end of February, so all children must be of a certain age on 1 March to begin class in August.

All parents of children born between September and February (i.e. still 4 years old on the school start date) are entitled to defer entry to Primary School if they believe their child is not ready for school.

Only children whose birthdays fall in January or February will be considered for funding for a subsequent year at an early years centre, unless there are special circumstances.

Children may leave school once they reach their statutory school leaving date; this is dependent on date of birth.  For children born between 1 March and 30 September, this date is 31 May of their 4th year of secondary school.  For children born between 1 October and 28 February, the last day of June is the first date they may leave school if they have a placement at college and the school have signed the health & safety forms.

Which high school the children go to depends on the area where they live, known as the "catchment area", which has a specific high school that takes children who live in that area.

Parents can also apply for a placement request if they would like their child to attend a school outside their catchment area and a panel will decide if the child is the most worthy (out of all placing requests) to take one of the spaces left after all children from the catchment area have been taken.

The table below lists list the numbers of children, schools and teachers in all publicly funded schools:

Home education is also legal in Scotland. Parents wishing to home educate do not need the permission of the Local Authority unless the children are already registered at a school. There are no exact numbers available for children being educated at home in Scotland.

Governance

Within the Scottish Government, the Cabinet Secretary for Education and Skills has overall responsibility for education provision in Scotland. The Cabinet Secretary is assisted by three junior ministers, currently the Minister for Childcare and Early Years, the Minister for Further Education, Higher Education and Science and the Minister for Employability and Training.

Qualifications framework

All educational qualifications in Scotland are part of the Scottish Credit and Qualifications Framework, ranging between Scottish Qualifications Authority qualifications, Scottish Vocational Qualifications and higher education qualifications.

Progression in Qualifications

The vast majority of Scottish pupils take Scottish Qualifications Certificate qualifications provided by the Scottish Qualifications Authority (SQA). Generally, most pupils take National 4/5s (previously Standard Grades, but some schools offered Intermediates instead) in S3-S4, and Highers in S5. The number of National 4/5 qualifications a pupil enters can vary drastically depending on the individual, with the most common number of National 5s taken, per pupil, in 2017 being 6, however some may choose to undertake as few as one or two, up to eight or nine. For those who wish to remain at school for the final year (S6), more Highers and Advanced Highers (formerly CSYS) in S6 can be taken. Previous qualifications Intermediate 1 and Intermediate 2 – were intended to be roughly equivalent to General and Credit Level Standard Grades respectively.

Pupils can go to university at the end of S5, as Highers provide the entry requirements for Scottish universities where degrees are normally four years long; however, recently it is more common for students to remain until S6, taking further Highers and/or taking Advanced Highers. The majority of English universities, the most popular choice for Scottish students who wish to study university degrees outside of Scotland, require Advanced Higher qualification levels as these are deemed by the English universities to be most similar to A-levels.

Secondary schools

Secondary education is provided by secondary schools throughout Scotland, both in the state and independent sector. The vast majority of schools in the state sector are administered directly by the local Education Authority, which is synonymous with the 32 councils used for local government.

There are three broad classifications of schools in Scotland:

 State-funded schools: These are schools under the management of an education authority. Theses schools do not charge fees to attend and have no entrance restrictions. Both denominational and non-denominational schools fall within this category. In the Education (Scotland) Act 1980 they are also referred to as 'public schools' (not to be confused with the other meaning of public school in England and Wales.
 Grant-Aided schools: Grant-Aided schools are independent of their education authority and can decide on their own governance, but are directly funded by the Scottish Ministers. There is one mainstream Grant-Aided school in Scotland, Jordanhill School, formerly linked to Jordanhill College of Education. The remaining seven Grant-Aided schools are special schools, which are Capability Scotland: Corseford School, Capability Scotland: Stanmore House School, Donaldson's School, East Park School, Harmeny School, the Royal Blind School and the Scottish Centre for Children with Motor Impairments (Craighalbert Centre). Despite their status, several of these schools are members of the Scottish Council of Independent Schools.
 Independent schools: Independent schools are schools that are not under management of an education authority and do not receive direct state funding. To qualify as a school, it must provide full-time education for at least five pupils of school age. Schools of this type are required to register and are subject to inspections by His Majesty's inspectors. Most are members of the Scottish Council of Independent Schools. One independent school, St Mary's Music School, receives Aided Places (similar to the abolished Assisted Places Scheme) where fees can be paid by the Scottish Ministers.

School naming

There is not a set name for secondary schools in Scotland, but whatever they might be called, with just a few specific exceptions in mainly rural or island authorities, state secondary schools in Scotland are fully comprehensive and non-selective. Amongst the state-run secondary schools:

 188 are nominally High Schools. These are spread across the country. Almost all Catholic secondaries are high schools, with the majority of the other names being non-denominational schools. For example, in West Dunbartonshire, the non-denominational schools are Vale of Leven, Dumbarton, and Clydebank Academies while the Catholic schools are Our Lady & Saint Patrick's High School and St Peter the Apostle's High School.
 131 are nominally Academies. These are spread across the country but are in high concentration in North-East Scotland, Ayrshire and Galloway, an example is Banchory Academy. There are also three Royal Academies, in Irvine, North Ayrshire; Tain; and Inverness.
 15 are nominally Secondary Schools (colloquially abbreviated to "secondaries"). These are found mostly in Glasgow.
 14 are nominally Grammar Schools. Most of these schools were defined as grammar schools under a previous (now dissolved) system but their names remain. Popular areas for grammar schools are Argyll and Bute, East Lothian and South Lanarkshire.
 13 are simply Schools. These schools cater for Primary as well as Secondary school children. They are found in rural areas or islands.
 8 are Junior High Schools. These schools are found exclusively in the Orkney and Shetland Islands. They cater for school children from P1 to S4.
 4 are Colleges. These include Madras College (in St Andrews, Fife), Marr College (in Troon, South Ayrshire) and St Joseph's College (in Dumfries, Dumfries and Galloway).

Other schools include The Community School of Auchterarder, Auchterarder, Perth and Kinross; The Nicolson Institute, Stornoway, Western Isles; North Walls Community School on Hoy, Orkney Islands and Wester Hailes Education Centre, Wester Hailes, Edinburgh. All of these are, equally, fully comprehensive non-selective schools, differing only in designation from all other state secondary schools in Scotland.

School provision

National Curriculum

In 2003, work began on an education reform programme, to produce a new Curriculum for Excellence that would replace existing guidance on the school curriculum. Curriculum for Excellence was launched in Scottish secondary schools from school session 2012–2013.

In 2017, new reforms were introduced moving control over curriculum and schools more towards head teachers and parents.

Religion in schools
The majority of schools are non-denominational, and include the parish schools, pioneered by the Church of Scotland and other Protestant Churches, which became state schools in 1872. Religious education is taught in non-denominational schools and in denominational schools. Of over 2,500 schools in Scotland, there are 366 state schools which are Roman Catholic, three Episcopalian and one Jewish. The Education (Scotland) Act 1918 brought Roman Catholic schools within the State education system, ensuring the promotion of a Roman Catholic ethos within such schools.

Attainment

In 2015, the Scottish Government launched the Scottish Attainment Challenge which aims to achieve equity in educational outcomes throughout Scotland. The Scottish Government envisages equity being achieved by ensuring every child has the same opportunity to succeed, with a particular focus on closing the poverty-related attainment gap. It is underpinned by national Scottish educational policies such as Curriculum for Excellence, Getting it Right for Every Child (GIRFEC) as well as the National Improvement Framework. The attainment challenge focuses and accelerates targeted improvement activity in literacy, numeracy and health and wellbeing in specific areas of Scotland, known as "challenge authorities" (those councils with a higher percentage of children growing up in poverty and deprivation). At a cost of £750 million to the Scottish Government through the Attainment Scotland Fund, the challenge is a targeted initiative focused on supporting pupils in the local authorities of Scotland with the highest concentrations of deprivation. Currently, the nine 'Challenge Authorities' are Glasgow City Council, Dundee City Council, Inverclyde, West Dunbartonshire, North Ayrshire, Clackmannanshire, North Lanarkshire, East Ayrshire and Renfrewshire.

On 1 February 2017 the share each primary and secondary school will receive for the academic year 2017–2018 from the Scottish Government's £120 million Pupil Equity Funding was announced by the Deputy First Minister and Cabinet Secretary for Education and Skills John Swinney.  This funding is provided through the Attainment Scotland Fund and allocated directly to schools, targeted at those children most affected by the poverty related attainment gap.

Literacy and numeracy
The SNP-led government launched the Scottish Survey of Literacy and Numeracy in 2011. The survey showed a sustained decline in basic literacy and numeracy among school pupils over six years. It was then scrapped by the government and its measures of literacy were replaced in part with a system based on teacher judgements. The teacher judgement data from December 2018 indicated that 70% of pupils achieved the expected literacy level by the end of primary school.

The government withdrew Scotland from the Progress in International Reading Literacy Study in 2010, making international comparisons of literacy difficult. It remains part of the Programme for International Student Assessment, which shows that Scotland's international standing in reading and mathematics (as well as science) in schools fell between the first decade of the century and 2018.

The Scottish Survey of Adult Literacies in 2009 reported that 26.7% of adults in Scotland "may face occasional challenges and constrained opportunities due to their literacies difficulties, but will generally cope with their day-to-day lives". Of that group, 3.6% "face serious challenges in their literacies practices".

Music education
Music education is available at several levels. Formal music education begins at 4½ years and can progress as high as postgraduate studies. Music education can take place within a Scottish Music school; through a music service or privately.

Scottish Gaelic medium education

Some schools in Scotland provide education given in the Scottish Gaelic language. They are mainly located in the main cities of Scotland and in areas with higher amounts of Gaelic speakers. Gaelic medium education is becoming increasingly popular throughout Scotland, and the number of pupils who are in Gaelic medium education at primary school level has risen from 24 in 1985, to 2500 in the 2012–13 school year.

Further education

Further education is provided through a network of further education colleges available to people having reached the end of compulsory education at 16. In the early 2010s, colleges were merged to form larger, regional institutions.

Colleges offer a wide range of vocational qualifications to young people and older adults, including vocational, competency-based qualifications (previously known as SVQs), Higher National Certificates and Higher National Diplomas. In Scotland, FE college students receiving certain qualifications - frequently HNC and HND qualifications in a relevant subject - can apply for entry at a later stage at university.

Further education colleges also provide support to apprenticeship programmes, which are coordinated by the public body Skills Development Scotland.

Higher education

There are fifteen universities in Scotland and three other institutions of higher education which have the authority to award academic degrees. The oldest is St. Andrews, which was founded in 1413. Three other "ancient universities", Glasgow, Aberdeen and Edinburgh, date from before 1600. The University of the Highlands and Islands (UHI) gained full university status in 2011, having been created through the federation of 13 colleges and research institutions across the Highlands and Islands, a process that began in 2001.

All Scottish universities have the power to award degrees at all levels: undergraduate, taught postgraduate, and doctoral. Education in Scotland is controlled by the Scottish Government under the terms of the Scotland Act 1998. The minister responsible for higher education is the Cabinet Secretary for Education and Skills, currently John Swinney MSP of the Scottish National Party. University status in Scotland and throughout the United Kingdom today is conferred by the Privy Council which takes advice from the Quality Assurance Agency for Higher Education.

All Scottish universities are public universities and funded by the Scottish Government (through its Scottish Funding Council) and financial support is provided for Scottish-domiciled students by the Student Awards Agency for Scotland. Students ordinarily resident in Scotland or the European Union do not pay tuition fees for their first undergraduate degree, but tuition fees are charged for those from the rest of the United Kingdom. All students are required to pay tuition fees for postgraduate education (e.g. MSc, PhD), except in certain priority areas funded by the Scottish Government, or if another source of funding can be found (e.g. research council studentship for a PhD). A representative body called Universities Scotland works to promote Scotland's universities, as well as six other higher education institutions.

The university sector in Scotland had a total income of £3.5 billion in 2014/15 with the Scottish Government giving approximately £623 million in funding for individual university student support. The Scottish Funding Council contributing £1.1 billion of public money to the fifteen universities, this was a six per cent reduction since 2010/11.

In 2014–15, approximately 232,570 students studied at universities or institutes of higher education in Scotland, of which 56% were female and 44% male, with 66% being domiciled in Scotland, 12% from the rest of the United Kingdom, 9% from the EU and the remaining 13% being international students. Of all these, approximately 76% were studying for their first degree (i.e. undergraduate level) and 24% for a taught postgraduate degree (primarily a master's degree) or a doctoral research degree (primarily PhD). The remainder were mostly on other programmes such as Higher National Diploma. 16,000 students were studying in Scotland with The Open University via distance-learning, and the Open University teaches 40 per cent of Scotland's part-time undergraduates.

In the 2019 QS World University Rankings, three Scottish universities are among the top 100 worldwide: University of Edinburgh (at 18), University of Glasgow (at 69), University of St. Andrews (at 97). Other high ranked universities are the University of Aberdeen (at 172), University of Strathclyde (at 268), University of Dundee (at 272), Heriot-Watt University (at 302) and University of Stirling (at 417).

See also
 List of schools in Scotland
 List of independent schools in Scotland
 Home education in the United Kingdom
 Music schools in Scotland
 Association of Educational Development and Improvement Professionals
 List of further education colleges in Scotland
 Her Majesty's Inspectorate of Education (Scotland)

References

Further reading
 Arnott, Margaret, and Jenny Ozga. "Education and nationalism: The discourse of education policy in Scotland." Discourse: Studies in the cultural politics of education 31.3 (2010): 335–350.
 Clark, Margaret, and Pamela Munn. Education in Scotland (Taylor & Francis, 1998) online.
 Munn, Pamela, et al. "Schools for the 21st century: the national debate on education in Scotland." Research Papers in Education 19.4 (2004): 433–452. Online
 Passow, A. Harry et al. The National Case Study: An Empirical Comparative Study of Twenty-One Educational Systems.  (1976) online
 Riddell, Sheila. Higher Education in Scotland and the UK'' (Edinburgh University Press, 2015).

External links
 Silicon Glen, Scotland – Intro to Scottish Education

 
Scotland
Public bodies of the Scottish Government
Scottish Government Learning and Justice Directorate